Remi Lindholm (born 17 January 1998) is a Finnish cross-country skier who competes internationally.
 
He represented his country at the 2022 Winter Olympics. During the 50 kilometre freestyle he suffered a frozen penis. This was the second time in his career that this happened.

Cross-country skiing results
All results are sourced from the International Ski Federation (FIS).

Olympic Games

Distance reduced to 30 km due to weather conditions.

World Championships

World Cup

Season standings

References

1998 births
Living people
Finnish male cross-country skiers
Cross-country skiers at the 2022 Winter Olympics
Olympic cross-country skiers of Finland
People from Rovaniemi
Cross-country skiers at the 2016 Winter Youth Olympics
Sportspeople from Lapland (Finland)